Wilfie is a nickname of:

 Wilf Greaves (born 1935), Canadian retired boxer
 Wilfrid Reid (1884-1973), English golfer and golf course designer
 Wilfrid Wilfie Starr (1908-1976), Canadian National Hockey League player

See also
 Wilf

Lists of people by nickname
Hypocorisms